The National Health Service (Consequential Provisions) Act 2006 (c 43) is an Act of the Parliament of the United Kingdom.

Section 3 - National Assembly for Wales (Transfer of Functions Order) 1999
This section makes provision in relation to the construction of Schedule 1 to the National Assembly for Wales (Transfer of Functions Order) 1999 (S.I. 1999/672).

Schedule 1 - Consequential amendments
Paragraphs 53 was repealed by Part 18 of Schedule 18 to Local Government and Public Involvement in Health Act 2007.

Paragraph 54(d) was repealed by Part 1 of Schedule 4 to the Transfer of Tribunal Functions Order 2010 (S.I. 2010/22)

Paragraph 63 was repealed by Part 3 of Schedule 11 to the Mental Health Act 2007.

Paragraphs 99 to 101 were repealed by Part 1 of Schedule 3 to the Corporation Tax Act 2010.

Paragraph 157(c) was repealed by Part 1 of Schedule 4 to the Transfer of Tribunal Functions Order 2010 (S.I. 2010/22)

Paragraph 202 was repealed by Schedule 2 to the Education and Skills Act 2008.

Paragraph 206 was repealed by Part 6 of Schedule 18 to Local Government and Public Involvement in Health Act 2007.

Paragraph 211(h) was repealed by Part 18 of Schedule 18 to Local Government and Public Involvement in Health Act 2007.

Paragraphs 272 to 274 were repealed by Part 1 of Schedule 4 to the Transfer of Tribunal Functions Order 2010 (S.I. 2010/22)

Schedule 2 - Transitional and saving provision
Paragraph 16 was amended by regulation 7(a) of the Local Health Boards (Directed Functions) (Wales) Regulations 2009 (S.I. 2009/1511 (W.147))

References
Halsbury's Statutes

External links
The National Health Service (Consequential Provisions) Act 2006, as amended from the National Archives.
The National Health Service (Consequential Provisions) Act 2006, as originally enacted from the National Archives.
National Health Service (Consequential Provisions) Act 2006: Table of Destinations. HMSO. 2007.

United Kingdom Acts of Parliament 2006